The following lists events that happened during 2017 in Rwanda.

Incumbents
President: Paul Kagame
Prime Minister: Anastase Murekezi (until August 30), Édouard Ngirente (starting August 30)

Events

August
4 August - Voters go to the polls to vote for President in the election. Paul Kagame wins with 98.66% of the vote despite challenges from the opposition.

Predicted and scheduled events

Date unknown
100% of the population will have access to clean water.
70% of the population will have access to electricity.

References

 
Rwanda
2010s in Rwanda
Years of the 21st century in Rwanda
Rwanda